Dominique Claude Rocheteau (born 14 January 1955) is a French former professional footballer who played as a winger. A French international, he played in three FIFA World Cups, scoring at least one goal in each of them, and was part of the team that won UEFA Euro 1984. At club level, he won four Division 1 titles, three Coupes de France and played in the 1976 European Cup Final.

Club career
Born in Saintes, Charente-Maritime, Rocheteau began his professional career with AS Saint-Étienne, when they were the most successful and popular football team in France. He was a sinuous and incisive outside right who was nicknamed lAnge Vert ("The Green Angel"). Injured, he played only the last eight minutes of the 1976 European Cup Final, which Saint-Étienne lost 1–0 to Bayern Munich. He won three Division 1 titles (1974–1976) and one Coupe de France with Saint-Étienne. He transferred to Paris Saint-Germain in 1980 with whom he won one Division 1 title (1986) and two Coupes de France (1982–1983). In 1987, he was transferred to Toulouse FC, for whom he played two seasons before retiring in 1989.

Asked in 2012 about his most memorable football moment, Rocheteau cited his 107th-minute decisive goal in the second leg of the 1975–76 European Cup quarter-final against Dynamo Kyiv. Saint-Étienne had lost the first leg 2–0 but won the second leg 3–0 after extra-time. Dynamo Kyiv were the previous year's winners of the 1974–75 European Cup Winners' Cup.

International career
With the France national football team, Rocheteau won 49 caps from 1975–1986 and scored 15 goals. He played in three FIFA World Cups, in 1978, 1982 and 1986, and was part of the team that won UEFA Euro 1984 (though Rocheteau missed the final due to injury).

Rocheteau played two matches and scored once at the 1978 World Cup, where France were eliminated in the group stage. Four years later in 1982, he played four matches and scored twice. He started for France in their semi-final defeat against West Germany, and successfully converted his penalty in the shoot-out. In 1986, Rocheteau scored only one goal but made four assists; he played four matches, including the quarter-final against Brazil (he was injured and substituted during that match in extra-time and hence did not partake in the penalty shootout), but did not play in the semi-final against West Germany.

Personal and later life
Rocheteau grew up in Étaules, Charente-Maritime where his father and grandfather ran an oyster farm. The business was later taken over by his brother Antony.

After his retirement, Rocheteau shortly became a sports agent, working for David Ginola and Reynald Pedros. In 2002, he became head of the National Ethics Committee of the French Football Federation. He joined the Saint-Étienne staff in 2010, and has since held various management positions in the club.

Away from football, Rocheteau has been noted for his far-left views, and has been associated with the Ligue communiste révolutionnaire and Lutte Ouvrière. In 1995, he played a supporting fictional character in Maurice Pialat's film Le Garçu'', starring Gérard Depardieu. He has appeared in a few other movies, TV shows and commercials.

Career statistics
Club

International

HonoursSaint-ÉtienneDivision 1: 1973–74, 1974–75, 1975–76
Coupe de France: 1976–77
European Cup runner-up: 1975–76Paris Saint-GermainDivision 1: 1985–86
Coupe de France: 1981–82, 1982–83France'''
UEFA European Championship: 1984
Artemio Franchi Trophy: 1985

References

External links

1955 births
Living people
People from Saintes, Charente-Maritime
Sportspeople from Charente-Maritime
French footballers
France international footballers
Association football forwards
AS Saint-Étienne players
Paris Saint-Germain F.C. players
Toulouse FC players
Ligue 1 players
1978 FIFA World Cup players
1982 FIFA World Cup players
UEFA Euro 1984 players
1986 FIFA World Cup players
UEFA European Championship-winning players
Mediterranean Games silver medalists for France
Mediterranean Games medalists in football
Competitors at the 1975 Mediterranean Games
French communists
French socialists
French Trotskyists
Footballers from Nouvelle-Aquitaine